Ganj Ali Sara (also Romanized as Ganj ʿAlī Sarā; also known as Ganjīsarā) is a village in Lat Leyl Rural District, Otaqvar District, Langarud County, Gilan Province, Iran. At the 2006 census, its population was 45, in 14 families.

References 

Populated places in Langarud County